John Farrington may refer to:

John Farrington (footballer) (born 1947), English professional footballer
John Farrington (athlete) (born 1942), Australian runner
John Farrington (MP) (1609–1680), Member of Parliament (MP) for Chichester
John Farrington (Massachusetts colonist), early American colonist
John Farrington (Massachusetts politician), Member of the Great and General Court of Massachusetts
Bo Farrington (1936–1964), American football player

See also
Farrington (disambiguation)